Mark Durnan (born 28 November 1992) is a Scottish professional footballer who plays as a defender for Scottish League One club Alloa Athletic. Durnan has previously played for St Johnstone, Queen of the South, Dundee United, Dunfermline Athletic and Falkirk, as well as Arbroath, Stranraer and Elgin City on loan.

Career

Early career
Durnan started his career in the youth system at Clyde before moving to St Johnstone in 2008  but in his time at the Perth club, Durnan failed to have a first-team appearance. Whilst at the Saints, Durnan went out on loan to various clubs. In August 2010, Durnan moved out on loan to Arbroath. On 23 August 2011, Durnan was loaned out to Stranraer for one month  and on 11 January 2012, Durnan was loaned out to Elgin City for the remainder of that season.

Queen of the South
On 25 July 2012, Durnan signed for Dumfries club Queen of the South, signing a one-year contract. In his first season at the club Queens won the 2012–13 Scottish Second Division title  and the Scottish Challenge Cup. On 19 April 2013, Durnan signed a new one-year contract with the Doonhamers. At the end of that season, Durnan was one of six Queens players named in the PFA Scotland 2012–13 Second Division Team of the Year. On 7 January 2014, Durnan extended his contract with the Dumfries club.

Dundee United
In June 2015, Durnan signed a three-year contract with Dundee United. Durnan scored his first goal for the club on 23 January 2016 in a 5–1 win over Kilmarnock. Durnan spent three seasons at Tannadice, before being released by the Terrors in May 2018.

Dunfermline
After leaving the Arabs, Durnan signed for Dunfermline Athletic during the 2018 close season  and was released in May 2019 after only one season with the Pars.

Falkirk
On 21 June 2019, Durnan signed a two-year contract with Scottish League One club Falkirk.

Alloa Athletic
Durnan signed for Alloa Athletic in June 2021.

Career statistics

Honours
Queen of the South
Scottish Challenge Cup: 2012–13

Dundee United
 Scottish Challenge Cup: 2016-17

References

1992 births
Living people
Scottish footballers
Clyde F.C. players
St Johnstone F.C. players
Arbroath F.C. players
Stranraer F.C. players
Elgin City F.C. players
Queen of the South F.C. players
Dundee United F.C. players
Scottish Football League players
Scottish Professional Football League players
Association football defenders
Dunfermline Athletic F.C. players
Falkirk F.C. players
Alloa Athletic F.C. players